Richland Creek may refer to:
 Richland Creek (Arkansas), a National Wild and Scenic River
 Richland Creek (Oconee River tributary), a stream in Georgia
 Richland Creek (Illinois), a protected area of Illinois
 Richland Creek (Indiana), in Greene County, Indiana
 Richland Creek (Kansas)
 Missouri
 Richland Creek (Big Creek), a stream in Missouri
 Richland Creek (Crows Fork Creek), a stream in Missouri
 Richland Creek (Missouri River), a stream in Missouri
 North Carolina
 Richland Creek (Deep River tributary, Guilford), a stream in Guilford County, North Carolina
 Richland Creek (Reedy Fork tributary), a stream in Guilford County, North Carolina
 Richland Creek (South Hyco Creek tributary), a stream in Person County, North Carolina
 Richland Creek (Deep River tributary, Randolph), a stream in Randolph County, North Carolina
 Richland Creek (Crabtree Creek tributary), a stream in Wake County, North Carolina
 Tennessee
 Richland Creek (Tennessee), a tributary of the Elk River
 Richland Creek (Nashville, Tennessee), a tributary of the Cumberland River in West Nashville
 Richland Creek (Texas)
 Richland Creek Wildlife Management Area